The 1960 Campeonato Nacional de Fútbol Profesional, was the 28th season of top-flight football in Chile. Colo-Colo won their eighth title following a 5–2 win against Rangers in the championship last match day on 10 December 1960, also qualifying to the 1961 Copa de Campeones de America.

League table

Results

Relegation table

Topscorer

See also
1960 Copa Preparación

References

External links
ANFP 
RSSSF Chile 1960

Primera División de Chile seasons
Chile
Prim